Fawzi Farghali (-August 31, 2009 in Cairo) served as Arab Regional Scout Executive for the World Scout Bureau.

In 1986, he was awarded the 186th Bronze Wolf, the only distinction of the World Organization of the Scout Movement, awarded by the World Scout Committee for exceptional services to world Scouting.

References

External links

Recipients of the Bronze Wolf Award
Year of birth missing
Scouting and Guiding in Switzerland